Joshua 23 is the twenty-third  chapter of the Book of Joshua in the Hebrew Bible or in the Old Testament of the Christian Bible. According to Jewish tradition  the book was attributed to the Joshua, with additions by the high priests Eleazar and Phinehas, but modern scholars view it as part of the Deuteronomistic History, which spans the books of Deuteronomy to 2 Kings, attributed to nationalistic and devotedly Yahwistic writers during the time of the reformer Judean king Josiah in 7th century BCE. This chapter records the Joshua's farewell address to tribes of Israel, a part of a section comprising Joshua 22:1–24:33 about the Israelites preparing for life in the land of Canaan.

Text
This chapter was originally written in the Hebrew language. It is divided into 16 verses.

Textual witnesses
Some early manuscripts containing the text of this chapter in Hebrew are of the Masoretic Text tradition, which includes the Codex Cairensis (895), Aleppo Codex (10th century), and Codex Leningradensis (1008).

Extant ancient manuscripts of a translation into Koine Greek known as the Septuagint (originally was made in the last few centuries BCE) include Codex Vaticanus (B; B; 4th century) and Codex Alexandrinus (A; A; 5th century).

Analysis

The narrative of Israelites preparing for life in the land comprising verses 22:1 to 24:33 of the Book of Joshua and has the following outline:
A. The Jordan Altar (22:1–34)
B. Joshua's Farewell (23:1–16)
1. The Setting (23:1–2a)
2. The Assurance of the Allotment (23:2b–5)
3. Encouragement to Enduring Faithfulness (23:6–13)
4. The Certain Fulfillment of God's Word (23:14–16)
C. Covenant and Conclusion (24:1–33)

The book of Joshua is concluded with two distinct ceremonies, each seeming in itself to be a finale:
 A farewell address of Joshua to the gathered tribes in an unnamed place (Joshua 23)
 A covenant renewal ceremony at Shechem (Joshua 24)

Joshua's Farewell (23:1–16)
Joshua's farewell address to the gathered Israel tribes in this chapter is linked to the narrative of conquest, connecting with the resumptive statements in Joshua 11:23 and 21:43–45 of the fulfilment of promise, complete conquest, and rest from war. The opening verse (1b) repeats word for word a phrase from Joshua 13:1 about Joshua's advanced age. The address warns the people to hold fast to the law of Moses (verse 6; cf. Joshua 1:7), and to 'love' YHWH himself (verse 11, cf. Deuteronomy 6:5—the term 'love' denotes 'covenant loyalty'). They must not copy the worship practices of the native peoples that still lived among them (verses 7, 16), nor intermarry with them (verse 12; cf. Deuteronomy 7:1–5). If they do, YHWH will cease to drive out the nations, and Israel people themselves will be driven off their acquired land (verses 15, 16; cf. Deuteronomy 30:17–18). Here Joshua states the two possibilities of the covenant: "faithfulness and possession", or "unfaithfulness and loss", as a choice with its consequences (cf. Deuteronomy 28). Furthermore, Joshua warns that the 'curses' of the covenant will certainly come (verse 15b; cf. Deuteronomy 4:25–31; 30:1–5).

See also

Related Bible parts: Joshua 11, Joshua 21

Notes

References

Sources

External links
 Jewish translations:
 Yehoshua - Joshua - Chapter 23 (Judaica Press). Hebrew text and English translation [with Rashi's commentary] at Chabad.org
 Christian translations:
 Online Bible at GospelHall.org (ESV, KJV, Darby, American Standard Version, Bible in Basic English)
 Joshua chapter 23. Bible Gateway

23